Horiike (written: 堀池) is a Japanese surname. Notable people with the surname include:

, Japanese architect
, Japanese footballer
, Japanese footballer

Japanese-language surnames